Pabitra Margherita is an Indian politician. Margherita is a Member of Parliament (since March 2022), representing Assam in the Rajya Sabha the upper house of India's Parliament as a member of the Bharatiya Janata Party. He joined politics in 2014 and became an active member of Bharatiya Janata Party. He is serving as a Spokesperson of Assam BJP since 2014. He also served as Prabhari of Social Media Cell, Assam BJP and Zila Prabhari of Kamrup (North) District BJP. He also served as Chairman of Jyoti Chitraban, Govt. of Assam from 2017 to 2021. He also served as Member Secretary of State Level Advisory Committee for Students and Youth Welfare, Govt. of Assam from November 2021 to March 2022.Besides this he used to be great assamese actor. "Mon jai" is one his biggest hit film of all time.

Currently he is a member of Consultative Committee of Ministry of Information and Broadcasting. as well as he is serving as Political Secretary to Chief Minister of Assam.

He was the founder Chief Editor of the monthly Maya from 1998 to 2002. He also served as founder chief editor of another Assamese cultural monthly SaReGaMa from 2002 to 2005.

References

Bharatiya Janata Party politicians from Assam
Assam politicians
Living people
1974 births